Regent Park is a neighbourhood of South Kolkata, in West Bengal, India.

Geography

Police district
Regent Park police station is in the South Suburban division of Kolkata Police. It is located at 45/D/2A, Moore Avenue, Kolkata-700040.

Patuli Women police station has jurisdiction over all police districts under the jurisdiction of South Suburban Division i.e. Netaji Nagar, Jadavpur, Kasba, Regent Park, Bansdroni, Garfa and Patuli.

Jadavpur, Thakurpukur, Behala, Purba Jadavpur, Tiljala, Regent Park, Metiabruz, Nadial and Kasba police stations were transferred from South 24 Parganas to Kolkata in 2011. Except Metiabruz, all the police stations were split into two. The new police stations are Parnasree, Haridevpur, Garfa, Patuli, Survey Park, Pragati Maidan, Bansdroni and Rajabagan.

Education
GD Birla Centre for Education is an English-medium ICSE school, classes LKG to XII, at 118, NSC Bose Road, Regent Park, Kolkata-700 040. Sports facilities: taekwando, skating, table tennis, chess, basketball. Arrangements for teaching French, German and Mandarin.

The Future Foundation School, one of the best schools in India, is an English-medium ICSE school, classes Nursery-XII, at 3 Regent Park, Kolkata-700 040.

References

Neighbourhoods in Kolkata